{{DISPLAYTITLE:C3H4Cl2O2}}
The molecular formula C3H4Cl2O2 (molar mass: 142.97 g/mol, exact mass: 141.9588 u) may refer to:

 Chloroethyl chloroformate
 Dalapon